KTBB (600 kHz) is a commercial AM radio station licensed to Tyler, Texas, serving the Tyler-Longview area with a news/talk format. The station is owned by Paul Gleiser, through licensee ATW Media, LLC., and is simulcast on sister station KTBB-FM 97.5 MHz in Troup, Texas.

Studios for KTBB AM and FM are co-located with KRWR in One American Center at 909 ESE Loop 323, at the intersection with New Copeland Road; the transmitter is off County Road 283 North in Whitehouse, Texas.  By day, KTBB is powered at 5,000 watts. But at night, to protect other stations on 600 AM, KTBB reduces power to 2,500 watts.  It uses a directional antenna at all times.

History
In April 1947, KTBB signed on the air. It was owned and operated by the Blackstone Broadcasting Company.  The call sign includes the initials for Tyler and Blackstone Broadcasting.  KTBB originally broadcast with 500 watts.

By the 1960s, the power had increased to 1,000 watts.  It was owned by Family Stations, not to be confused with California-based Family Radio, a religious broadcaster.  The format was middle of the road music, plus news and sports.

By the 1980s, the music was eliminated and the station was all-talk and news.  The power increased to 5,000 watts days and 2,500 watts nights.

References

External links

TBB
News and talk radio stations in the United States
Radio stations established in 1975